Arthur Evans (12 July 1871 – 26 March 1950) was an Australian cricketer. He played eighteen first-class matches for South Australia between 1895 and 1904.

See also
 List of South Australian representative cricketers

References

External links
 

1871 births
1950 deaths
Australian cricketers
South Australia cricketers
Cricketers from Adelaide